High Wych is a village and civil parish in the East Hertfordshire district of Hertfordshire, England. The village is located a little over one mile south-west of the town of Sawbridgeworth, and around three miles north-east of Harlow in the neighbouring county of Essex.

The parish includes the settlements of Great Pennys, Trimms Green, Sacombs Ash, Allens Green, Chandlers, Carters, Rook End, Hoskins and Sayes Park. The village contains a Church of England primary school and a late 19th-century church, St James, with a marble reredos and a Father Willis organ. A moated site is all that remains of the medieval residence of Mathams. There is also a Georgian historical house called the Manor of Groves which is now a hotel.

High Wych was historically part of the parish of Sawbridgeworth. It became a separate ecclesiastical parish in 1862. High Wych remained part of the civil parish of Sawbridgeworth until 1 April 1901 when it became a separate civil parish.

See also 
The Hundred Parishes

References

External links 

Landscape character assessment

Villages in Hertfordshire
Civil parishes in Hertfordshire
East Hertfordshire District